The 1951 Princeton Tigers baseball team represented Princeton University in the 1951 NCAA baseball season. The Tigers played their home games at Bill Clarke Field. The team was coached by Emerson Dickman serving his 3rd year at Princeton.

The Tigers won the Eastern Intercollegiate Baseball League championship and advanced to the College World Series, where they were defeated by the Tennessee Volunteers.

Roster

Schedule 

! style="" | Regular Season
|- valign="top" 

|- align="center" bgcolor="#ccffcc"
| 1 || April ||  || Bill Clarke Field • Princeton, New Jersey || 2–1 || 1–0 || 0–0
|- align="center" bgcolor="#ccffcc"
| 2 || April ||  || Bill Clarke Field • Princeton, New Jersey  || 2–0 || 2–0 || 0–0
|- align="center" bgcolor="#ccffcc"
| 3 || April ||  || Bill Clarke Field • Princeton, New Jersey || 2–1 || 3–0 || 0–0
|- align="center" bgcolor="#ccffcc"
| 4 || April ||  || Bill Clarke Field • Princeton, New Jersey || 8–1 || 4–0 || 0–0
|- align="center" bgcolor="#ffcccc"
| 5 || April ||  || Bill Clarke Field • Princeton, New Jersey || 4–5 || 4–1 || 0–0
|- align="center" bgcolor="#ccffcc"
| 6 || April || at  || River Field • Philadelphia, Pennsylvania || 6–4 || 5–1 || 1–0
|- align="center" bgcolor="#ccffcc"
| 7 || April ||  || Unknown • Philadelphia, Pennsylvania || 4–3 || 6–1 || 1–0
|- align="center" bgcolor="#ffcccc"
| 8 || April || at  || Robertson Field at Satow Stadium • New York, New York || 3–4 || 6–2 || 1–1
|- align="center" bgcolor="#ccffcc"
| 9 || April ||  || Bill Clarke Field • Princeton, New Jersey || 6–2 || 7–2 || 1–1
|- align="center" bgcolor="#ccffcc"
| 10 || April || at  || Bill Clarke Field • Princeton, New Jersey || 6–2 || 8–2 || 2–1
|- align="center" bgcolor="#ccffcc"
| 11 || April || at  || Johnson Stadium at Doubleday Field • West Point, New York || 6–4 || 9–2 || 3–1
|- align="center" bgcolor="#ccffcc"
| 12 || April ||  || Bill Clarke Field • Princeton, New Jersey || 4–3 || 10–2 || 4–1
|-

|- align="center" bgcolor="#ccffcc"
| 13 || May 1 || at  || Unknown Field • Piscataway, New Jersey || 4–3 || 11–2 || 4–1
|- align="center" bgcolor="#ccffcc"
| 14 || May ||  || Bill Clarke Field • Princeton, New Jersey || 10–7 || 12–2 || 5–1
|- align="center" bgcolor="#ccffcc"
| 15 || May ||  || Bill Clarke Field • Princeton, New Jersey || 4–1 || 13–2 || 5–1
|- align="center" bgcolor="#ffcccc"
| 16 || May || at  || Unknown • Providence, Rhode Island || 2–6 || 13–3 || 5–2
|- align="center" bgcolor="#ccffcc"
| 17 || May ||  || Bill Clarke Field • Princeton, New Jersey || 8–0 || 14–3 || 5–2
|- align="center" bgcolor="#ccffcc"
| 18 || May ||  || Bill Clarke Field • Princeton, New Jersey || 2–1 || 15–3 || 5–2
|- align="center" bgcolor="#ccffcc"
| 19 || May ||  || Bill Clarke Field • Princeton, New Jersey || 8–3 || 16–3 || 5–2
|- align="center" bgcolor="#ccffcc"
| 20 || May ||  || Bill Clarke Field • Princeton, New Jersey || 5–0 || 17–3 || 6–2
|- align="center" bgcolor="#ffcccc"
| 21 || May || at  || Yale Field • West Haven, Connecticut || 1–2 || 17–4 || 6–2
|-

|- align="center" bgcolor="#ccffcc"
| 22 || June 6 || Rutgers || Bill Clarke Field • Princeton, New Jersey || 2–1 || 18–4 || 6–2
|- align="center" bgcolor="#ccffcc"
| 23 || June || Yale || Bill Clarke Field • Princeton, New Jersey || 7–6 || 19–4 || 7–2
|-

|-
|-
! style="" | Postseason
|- valign="top"

|- align="center" bgcolor="#ffcccc"
| 24 || June 8 || vs USC || Omaha Municipal Stadium • Omaha, Nebraska || 1–4 || 19–5 || 6–2
|- align="center" bgcolor="#ffcccc"
| 25 || June 9 || vs Tennessee || Omaha Municipal Stadium • Omaha, Nebraska || 2–3 || 19–6 || 6–2
|-

|- align="center" bgcolor="#ccffcc"
| 26 || June 19 || at  || Soldier's Field • Boston, Massachusetts|| 7–5 || 20–6 || 7–2
|-

|-
|

References 

Princeton Tigers baseball seasons
Princeton Tigers baseball
College World Series seasons
Eastern Intercollegiate Baseball League baseball champion seasons